Our Mirage is a German post-hardcore band from Marl, North Rhine-Westphalia, founded in 2017.

Story 
The band Our Mirage was founded by singer Timo Bonner, guitarist Steffen Hirz, bassist and background singer Manuel Möbs as well as the Drummer Daniel Maus. Before founding Our Mirage, Timo Bonner was active at Forever in Combat until 2017. The band then gave a number of concerts in Germany in 2017 and had their first small European tour in November of the same year. On July 11, 2018, the group, who had released four singles up to that point, signed a deal with the German music label Arising Empire. The album was officially released on August 24, 2018. On August 18, 2018, the group opened the Elbriot festival in Hamburg, where Killswitch Engage, Beartooth and Arch Enemy also performed on the same day. In December of the same year, the band accompanied Breathe Atlantis and Imminence on their European tour. In 2019 they opened for Callejon on their Hartgeld im Club pt.II tour.

Their first Headliner tour started in March 2019 together with Die Heart and The Disaster Area, which went across Germany with 5 dates. In the summer of 2019 the quartet played at several festivals throughout Germany. The Impericon Festival in Munich and the Deichbrand Festival in Cuxhaven were there. At the end of 2019, the band announced that they would release a new album called Unseen Relations in February 2020. Two singles from the album followed. After only two dates, the band had to abandon their tour in March 2020 and took a break from playing for almost two years, during which time they returned with three singles (Transparent, Remedy, Calling You). Three corona-compliant ones followed during the pandemic Concerts in Dortmund, Frankfurt and Munich.

In early 2022, the band also announced the continuation of the Unseen Relations Release tour. Including all postponed concerts and festivals from the pandemic, the band played more than 45 concerts. Festivals such as Vainstream, Fallen Fortress, Traffic Jam and many more were there. On August 20, 2022, the group reopened after the Corona break sold out Elbriot in Hamburg.

Style 
The lyrics, for which singer Timo Bonner is responsible, deal with depressions, anxiety states and bullying. In an interview, Bonner explained that personally experienced experiences are decisive for the themes of the band's songs. When asked whether fans' stories were also picked up and processed, Bonner replied that the song 'Heartbeat was written for his current girlfriend, who has always lived with panic attacks.

The band describes their music as "hard hitting lyrics with heart-hitting music" This is a mix of Melodic Hardcore and Post-Hardcore, which moves close to Alternative Rock. The band's songs on the debut album mostly move in "calm waters", but the successful production allows sound comparisons with Annisokay. The group's sound is described as "mellow but punchy", with the music r process musical elements of post-hardcore. The guitar riffs are described as "flat", the clear vocals as "clean picking".

 Discography 
 Albums
 2018: Lifeline (Arising Empire)
 2020: Unseen Relations (Arising Empire)
 2022: Eclipse (Arising Empire)

singles
 2018: Nightfall – Piano (Arising Empire)
 2019: Different Eyes (Arising Empire)
 2019: After All (Arising Empire)
 2019: Unseen (Arising Empire)
 2020: Transparent (Arising Empire)
 2020: Remedy (Arising Empire))
 2021: Through the Night (Arising Empire)
 2022: Calling You (Arising Empire)
 2022: Summertown (Arising Empire)
 2022: Black Hole (Arising Empire)
 2022: Help Me Out'' (Arising Empire)

Individual proofs 

German metalcore musical groups
Musical groups established in 2017
Metalcore musical groups
Post-hardcore groups
Arising Empire artists